Kalburlu is a village in the Artvin District, Artvin Province, Turkey. Its population is 68 (2021).

References

Villages in Artvin District